Rugma is a 1983 Indian Malayalam-language film, directed by P. G. Viswambharan, starring Mammootty, Menaka, Seema and Venu Nagavally.

Plot
The film is the story of Rugma (Seema) and her struggle to bring up her daughter (Menaka) after the death of her husband (Mammootty).

Cast
Seema - Rugma
Mammootty
Venu Nagavally
Menaka
Raghuvaran
Shubha 
Sukumari  
Rohini 
Adoor Bhasi
T. G. Ravi
Charuhasan
Kunchan
Alummoodan

Soundtrack
The music was composed by M. B. Sreenivasan and the lyrics were written by P. Bhaskaran.

References

External links

1983 films
1980s Malayalam-language films
Films directed by P. G. Viswambharan